The  2018 Skyrunner World Series was the 17th edition of the global skyrunning competition, Skyrunner World Series, organised by the International Skyrunning Federation from 2002. 

In this edition, compared with 2017, the Sky Extreme and Sky Ultra races have been unified in a single category called Sky Extra. The calendar was announced by ISF in October 2017.

Calendar

Sky Classic

Sky Extra

References

External links
 Skyrunner World Series

2018